Alketa Vejsiu (born 19 January 1984) is an Albanian television presenter, entrepreneur, model, producer and singer.

Career

Television 
 Gjeniu i Vogël
 Dancing with the Stars
 X Factor
 Dance with Me
 Your Face Sounds Familiar
 Festivali i Këngës 2019
 Sanremo Music Festival 2020
 Sanremo Music Festival 2021
 Në kurthin e Piter Pan

References

External links 
Official website

1984 births
Living people
People from Tirana
Albanian radio presenters
Albanian women radio presenters
Albanian television actresses
Albanian television presenters
Albanian businesspeople
21st-century Albanian women singers
Albanian women television presenters